André Luiz Rodrigues Lopes, or simply Andrezinho (born February 15, 1985), is a Brazilian footballer.

Club career

Early career
Prior to playing in Australia, Andrezinho had spent time with Brazilian clubs Atlético Mineiro, CENE, Juventude and Roma. He's also played in Uruguay for River Plate Montevideo and in China for Liaoning Whowin. Andrezinho played in Japan for Tokushima Vortis and Consadole Sapporo.

Perth Glory
On 4 August 2011, he signed a contract with A-League club, Perth Glory after the club decided to find a replacement for injured Victor Sikora. He made his debut in the A-League in Round 1 against Adelaide United. Andrezinho suffered an injury that prevented him from playing in the 2012 A-League Grand Final.

In July 2012, he joined Cypriot side AEP Paphos.

In June 2013 Andrezinho joined Kazakhstan Premier League side FC Ordabasy.

In July 2013 Andrezinho joined Thai Division 1 League side Phuket F.C.

In 2019, Andrezinho returned to Australia to sign with Victorian State League Division 1 side Preston Lions FC. However, after 10 appearances and 1 goal, he left the club mid-season to join fellow Division 1 side Caroline Springs George Cross FC.

Return to Brazil
In December 2019 Veranópolis confirmed, that Andrezinho had joined the club.

Club statistics

References

External links

1985 births
Living people
Footballers from Rio de Janeiro (city)
Brazilian footballers
Brazilian expatriate footballers
Clube Atlético Mineiro players
Perth Glory FC players
A-League Men players
Esporte Clube Juventude players
Club Atlético River Plate (Montevideo) players
América Futebol Clube (SP) players
Tokushima Vortis players
Hokkaido Consadole Sapporo players
J2 League players
Chinese Super League players
Liaoning F.C. players
Cypriot First Division players
AEP Paphos FC players
FC Ordabasy players
Preston Lions FC players
Sohar SC players
Veranópolis Esporte Clube Recreativo e Cultural players
Kazakhstan Premier League players
Expatriate footballers in Japan
Expatriate footballers in China
Expatriate footballers in Cyprus
Expatriate footballers in Thailand
Brazilian expatriate sportspeople in China
Brazilian expatriate sportspeople in Japan
Brazilian expatriate sportspeople in Cyprus
Brazilian expatriate sportspeople in Thailand
Brazilian expatriate sportspeople in Australia
Brazilian expatriate sportspeople in Oman
Association football forwards
Caroline Springs George Cross FC players